The 2016 IFSC Climbing World Cup was held in 16 locations. Bouldering, lead and speed competitions were held in 7 locations. The season began on 15 April in Meiringen, Switzerland and concluded on 27 November in Kranj, Slovenia.

The top 3 in each competition received medals, and the overall winners were awarded trophies. At the end of the season an overall ranking was determined based upon points, which athletes were awarded for finishing in the top 30 of each individual event.

The winners for bouldering were Tomoa Narasaki and Shauna Coxsey, for lead Domen Škofic and Janja Garnbret, and for speed Marcin Dzieński and Iuliia Kaplina, men and women respectively.

Highlights of the season 
In lead climbing, Slovenian athletes, Domen Škofic and Janja Garnbret clinched the overall titles of the season for men and women respectively, making it double lead titles for Slovenia.

France was the only nation in the top three National Team Ranking in all disciplines, ranked second in all.

Overview

Bouldering 

An overall ranking was determined based upon points, which athletes were awarded for finishing in the top 30 of each individual event.

Men 
6 best competition results were counted (not counting points in brackets) for IFSC Climbing World Cup 2016.

Women 
6 best competition results were counted (not counting points in brackets) for IFSC Climbing World Cup 2016.

National Teams 
For National Team Ranking, 3 best results per competition and category were counted (not counting results in brackets).

Country names as used by the IFSC

Lead 

An overall ranking was determined based upon points, which athletes were awarded for finishing in the top 30 of each individual event.

Men 
6 best competition results were counted (not counting results in parentheses) for IFSC Climbing Worldcup 2016.

Women 
6 best competition results were counted (not counting results in parentheses) for IFSC Climbing Worldcup 2016.

National Teams 
For National Team Ranking, 3 best results per competition and category were counted (not counting results in parentheses).

Speed 

An overall ranking was determined based upon points, which athletes were awarded for finishing in the top 30 of each individual event.

Men 
6 best competition results were counted (not counting points in brackets).

Women 
6 best competition results were counted (not counting points in brackets).

National Teams 
For National Team Ranking, 3 best results per competition and category were counted (not counting results in brackets).

Combined 
5 best competition results were counted. Participation in at least 2 disciplines was required.

Men 
The results of the ten most successful athletes of the Combined World Cup 2016:

Women 
The results of the ten most successful athletes of the Combined World Cup 2016:

References

External links 

IFSC Climbing World Cup
2016 in sport climbing